Don Droege is a former U.S. soccer defender who played seven seasons in the North American Soccer League and three seasons in the Major Indoor Soccer League.  He also earned eight caps with the U.S. national team between 1977 and 1979.

Youth and college
Droege grew up in St. Louis, Missouri and attended Christian Brothers College High School where he was the soccer team's 1971 and 1972 defensive MVP.  He was also co-captain of the 1972 team.  In addition to playing soccer, he was also a baseball letterman his senior year.  After graduating from high school, Droege attended St. Louis University, playing on the men's soccer team from 1973 to 1976.

NASL
In 1977, Droege signed with the Rochester Lancers of the North American Soccer League (NASL).  In December 1978, the Lancers traded Droege to the Washington Diplomats.  The Diplomats folded at the end of the 1980 season and Droege was selected by the New England Tea Men in the dispersal draft.  However, the Tea Men sold his contract to the Atlanta Chiefs for the 1981 season.  However, by that time the NASL's decline was accelerating and the Chiefs folded at the end of the season.  Droege moved again, this time to the Tulsa Roughnecks.  However, after eighteen games, the Roughnecks traded Droege to the Tampa Bay Rowdies in exchange for Njego Pesa and Terry Moore.  He saw time in seven games for the Rowdies in 1982.  In 1983, Droege finished his NASL career with the Chicago Sting.

MISL
In 1980, Droege signed with the Chicago Horizon of Major Indoor Soccer League (MISL).  The Horizon lasted only one season before folding.  Droege did not return to the MISL until he left the NASL in 1983.  That fall, Droege returned to Saint Louis to sign with the St. Louis Steamers. He spent two seasons with the Steamers before retiring from playing professionally in 1985.

National team
Droege's first game with the national team came in a 3–1 loss to Guatemala on September 18, 1977.  Nine days later, he came on as a substitute in a 3–0 loss to Mexico.  From that point on, he played the rest of the U.S. games in 1977.  He played in only one of the three U.S. games in 1978, then earned his last cap on May 2, 1979, in a 6–0 loss to France.

Droege was inducted into St. Louis Soccer Hall of Fame in 2005.

References

External links
 NASL/MISL stats

1955 births
Living people
American soccer players
Atlanta Chiefs players
Chicago Horizons players
Chicago Sting (NASL) players
Major Indoor Soccer League (1978–1992) players
North American Soccer League (1968–1984) players
North American Soccer League (1968–1984) indoor players
Soccer players from St. Louis
Saint Louis University alumni
Saint Louis Billikens men's soccer players
St. Louis Steamers (original MISL) players
Rochester Lancers (1967–1980) players
Tulsa Roughnecks (1978–1984) players
Tampa Bay Rowdies (1975–1993) players
United States men's international soccer players
Washington Diplomats (NASL) players
Association football defenders